Moss Lake also known as Whipple Lake is located northwest of Eagle Bay, New York. The outlet flows into North Branch Moose River. Fish species present in the lake are brook trout, lake trout, atlantic salmon, brown trout, yellow perch, and black bullhead. There is trail access located off Big Moose Lake Road. There is no ice fishing allowed on Moss Lake.

References 

Lakes of New York (state)
Lakes of Herkimer County, New York